Evelyn Margaret Sempier (née Ay; March 8, 1933 – October 18, 2008) was winner of the 1954 Miss America beauty pageant.

Early life
Ay was born the daughter of German immigrants in Ephrata, Pennsylvania.

Pageantry
She had a short but successful career in smaller beauty contests. As Miss Ephrata Fair and Tobacco Queen of Lancaster County in 1950, she wore a crown that looked like tobacco leaves. After graduating from Ephrata High School in 1951, she won the titles of Miss Pennsylvania AMVET and the Miss National AMVET in 1952, as well as the Miss Pennsylvania title in 1953. She was selected Miss America at the last year before the pageant was televised.

In a 1993 interview, "Evvy" said she was surprised at her victories. "That was the ultimate role model, like being Doris Day in real life." She embarked on her career as a favor to a friend who was trying to promote a pageant for the Junior Chamber International (JayCees). She traveled  during her yearlong reign, and remained active with the pageant for many years, judging many local pageants and the national Miss America contest in 1981.

Career
Sempier officially introduced the Nash Metropolitan at the 1954 Chicago Auto Show. She was a spokesperson for Nash Motors in promoting the first American car that was marketed specifically to women. She described her marketing for Nash as the finest among her 40-years of commercial relationships, and the company was "most generous in sponsoring Miss America in many parts of America."

Between the 1960s and 1990s, she made frequent appearances as a motivational speaker to women's and business groups.

Personal life
Shortly after passing on the Miss America crown, she married Carl G. Sempier, a Navy veteran and corporate executive on November 13, 1954, and had two children. Carl Sempier died in 2007. Sempier died on October 18, 2008 of colorectal cancer.

Evelyn Ay Sempier Quality of Life Award
The Evelyn Ay Sempier Quality of Life Award was established to honor the 1954 pageant winner. The award was introduced in 1988, and is given to select Miss America contestants involved with the Children's Miracle Network, as well as to "recognize contestants who excel in their commitment to community service".

References

External links
 https://web.archive.org/web/20060108200614/http://www.missamerica.com/our-miss-americas/1950/1954.asp Miss America profile
https://web.archive.org/web/20111002232616/http://www.lehighvalleylive.com/newsflash/index.ssf?%2Fbase%2Fnews-68%2F1224715458172590.xml&storylist=penn Evelyn Ay Sempier, Miss America 1954, dead at 75 (not valid)

1933 births
2008 deaths
American people of German descent
Miss America 1950s delegates
Miss America winners
Miss America Preliminary Swimsuit winners
Nash Motors people
Pennsylvania Dutch people
People from Ephrata, Pennsylvania
Place of death missing
20th-century American people